The Scranton Fire Department (also known as the City of Scranton Bureau of Fire, SFD, Scranton Fire, and Station 50) provides fire protection, rescue services, hazardous materials mitigation, to the City of Scranton, Pennsylvania. The department used volunteer fire companies throughout its history and was established as a career fire department on May 4, 1901. The city maintained a combination of paid and volunteer firefighters from 1901 to 1907 when a full time department was established. The Scranton Fire Department remains a full-time all career department today, with a total of about 142 professional firefighters and fire officers protecting the City of Scranton.

History 
The City of Scranton utilized numerous volunteer fire companies from 1866 (The year Scranton incorporated as a city) onward until the local government formally enacted an ordinance authorizing a paid bureau of fire in 1901. On May 4, 1901, the City of Scranton Bureau of Fire was established. This, however, did not remove volunteers from the City's fire responses, as the department continued to utilize volunteers in a paid/volunteer combination system until 1907.

During a Typhoid epidemic in 1906, the Health Bureau was concerned noise from audible fire sirens used to alert volunteers would disturb patients. In response to this, the Bureau of Fire added 25 permanent firefighters to its roster bolstering its paid staff and lessening the need for these audible fire siren systems.

In 1911, the Bureau of Fire purchased its first motorized fire apparatus, a Chief's car. More apparatus would be motorized going forward until horse-drawn firefighting vehicles were phased out completely in 1923.

Ambulance service 
The Scranton Fire Department began to maintain an ambulance service starting 1948. They were known as Car 20 (later known as Car 24) and Car 23. Two firefighters would staff the ambulance and respond to medical calls in the City. This would remain until 1988 when the ambulance service was discontinued.

Union representation 
After years of going without a union, Scranton Firefighters organized under The International Association of Firefighters (IAFF), Local 60. The Union lapsed its membership in the 1930s, again foregoing a union until 1940, when it rejoined under IAFF Local 669. This would remain until 2000 when the Union successfully won the right to use its original IAFF Local Union number. To this day Scranton Firefighters are represented by IAFF Local 60.

Stations and apparatus 
The City of Scranton currently maintains 7 fire stations which house all fire apparatus, firefighters, and offices for the fire department. This amounts to having 5 engine companies, 2 truck companies, a rescue company, and a command/chief car providing protection to the City of Scranton on a daily basis. The department also keeps specialty vehicles in reserve for use on specific incident types. Additionally, the city of Scranton keeps 4 engines, one rescue, one HAZMAT and one truck company in reserve in case additional fire protection service is needed or to swap out apparatus while the front line apparatus are maintained and repaired.

Fire station response areas and conditions 

 Fire Headquarters located at 518 Mulberry St, Scranton PA, 18510
 Fire Headquarters houses Engine Company No. 4, Truck Company No. 2, and Assistant Chief Car 21 (The shift commander). This station's first due area is Central City, the Hill Section, Green Ridge and parts of South Side. In the event of a second alarm fire these companies will respond everywhere in the city. In addition to the three units housed here, this station houses the Fire Prevention and Investigation offices, the office of the Deputy Chief and the office of the Superintendent of Fire. Fire Headquarters was built in 1905 and is a protected historical landmark.
 Rescue Company No. 1 located at 940 Wyoming Ave, Scranton, PA 18509
 This station houses Rescue Company No. 1 and Car 30-A, the department's structural collapse truck. Rescue Company No. 1 is dispatched on all alarms in the city. In addition to fire suppression, Rescue Co. 1 responds to all motor vehicle accidents, industrial accidents, rescue calls, and all other tasks demanded of a modern Rescue Company. This station also maintains and repairs the department's self contained breathing apparatus (SCBA). Car 30-A is only dispatched and manned when needed.
 Engine Company No. 2 located at 500 Gibbons St, Scranton, PA 18505
 This station houses Engine Company No. 2 and Engine Company No. 1 (Reserve). Engine Co. 2's First due area covers Southside and Minooka. This company will respond to East Mountain, West Side, Central City, and the Hill Section in the event of a second alarm fire. Engine Co. 2 is designated as one of Lackawanna County’s Decontamination units. This station is also where the department's hose is repaired. Engine Company No. 1 is only manned when additional staffing is needed or when acting as a replacement for another company.
 Truck Company No. 4 located at 1047 N Main Ave, Scranton, PA 18508
 This station houses Truck Company No. 4, and Engine Company No. 9 (Reserve). This station's first due covers West Side, North Scranton, Tripp Park, the Plot Section, parts of Central City, and Keyser Valley as its first due area. This company is on all second alarm fires. Engine Company No. 9 is only manned when additional staffing is needed or when acting as a replacement for another company.
 Engine Company No. 7 located at 1917 Luzerne St, Scranton, PA 18504
 This station houses Engine Company No. 7, Truck Company No. 1 (Reserve), and Attack No. 1 (Brush). This station's first due is West Side, Bellevue, West Mountain and Keyser Valley. When called on a second alarm it will go to North Scranton and parts of Central City. When requested Engine Co. 7 will also assist the Taylor Volunteer Fire Department and the Newton/Ransom Volunteer Fire Department. This station also repairs the department's fire helmets. Truck Company No. 1 is only manned when additional staffing is needed or when acting as a replacement for another company. Attack No. 1 is only dispatched and manned when requested for brush fires or other specialty incidents.
 Engine Company No. 8 located at 205 W Market St, Scranton, PA 18508
 This station houses Engine Company No. 8 and Car 30, the mobile air re-supply unit. This station's first due area is North Scranton, the Plot, and parts of Green Ridge. In the event of a second alarm fire Engine Co. 8 will go to West Side, Central City, parts of the Hill Section and Keyser Valley. This station also stores the mobile smoke house, used for presentations primarily for children to teach how to escape form a home fire. Car 30 is only dispatched manned when requested for specialty incidents or large structure fires.
 Engine Company No. 10 located at 1900 E Mountain Rd, Scranton, PA 18505
 This station houses Engine Company No. 10. this station responds to all of East Mountain, and parts of upper South Side for first alarm assignments. On a second alarm it will respond to south side, Minooka, the Hill Section and parts of Central City.

References 

Scranton, Pennsylvania
Fire departments in Pennsylvania